Fissistigma verrucosum, the Indian zig-zag vine, also known as hedvekuli, or jyrmi-soh-ram-khlaw is a species of flowering liana in the Annonaceae family. It is endemic to northeast India.

References

Annonaceae
Taxa named by Joseph Dalton Hooker